Kim Jung-sook (born 15 November 1954) is a South Korean classical singer who served as first lady of South Korea from 2017 to 2022, as the wife of the 12th president of South Korea Moon Jae-in.

Overview 
Kim's parents ran a hanbok shop at Gwangjang market in Seoul, but later moved to Ganghwa Island. She graduated from the Sookmyung Girls' Middle and High School. Kim also holds a BA in Vocal Music at Kyung Hee University. She was a member of the Seoul Metropolitan Chorus from 1978 to 1982.

Kim met her future husband, Moon, during their university years at Kyung Hee University. Their relationship began to develop after she took care of Moon when he had been knocked out by tear gas during an anti-Park Chung-hee protest. Moon and Kim married in 1981 when Moon was studying at the Judicial Research and Training Institute, after Kim proposed marriage to Moon in an act that was virtually unheard of in South Korea.

Characterized by her "easy-going" personality, Kim has been given the nickname "Jolly Lady", widely popularised during Moon's presidential campaign in 2017.

Kim became First Lady of the Republic of Korea on her husband's inauguration as President on 10 May 2017. As First Lady, she focused on members of minority groups such as people with disabilities, single-parent families and elderly people by hosting related events arranged by the Blue House. She also made commemorative speeches for cultural events and visited related facilities when accompanying her husband's official or state visit to foreign countries.

Pets

While at the Blue House, Kim and Moon lived with adopted dogs and cats from their hometown of Yangsan. Among those, a dog named Maru (a Pungsan dog) and a cat named Jjing-jjing (or Jjing-Jjing-ee ). They also had a dog named Tory (a mixed-breed), who was adopted from an animal shelter in contrast with other "First Dogs" who have traditionally been purebred Jindo dogs. They also received pair of female and male Pungsan dogs, Gom-ee and Song-gang, respectively, from Pyongyang as a gift shortly after the Inter-Korean Summit in September 2018. Gom-ee later gave birth to six puppies San-ee, Deul-ee, Gang-ee, Byul-ee, Dal-ee and Hen-nim named after the Korean words for mountain, grass field, river, star, the Moon and the Sun. On 30 August 2019, the six puppies were sent to Seoul, Incheon, Daejeon and Gwangju, leaving behind their parents at the Blue House.

Honours

National honours
:  Recipient of the Grand Order of Mugunghwa (3 May 2022) President Moon Jae-in self-awarded himself and his wife, Kim, with the highest order awarded by the government of Korea.

Foreign honours
:  Grand Decoration of Honour in Gold with Sash of the Decoration of Honour for Services to the Republic of Austria (14 June 2021)
:  Grand Cross of the Royal Norwegian Order of Merit (12 June 2019)
:  Grand Cross of the Order of Civil Merit (8 June 2021)
:  Commander Grand Cross of the Royal Order of the Polar Star (14 June 2019)

"Wardrobe scandal"  

Kim has been accused of abusing public funds for personal clothing and accessories. People in the conservative right wing gathered photos of Kim at domestic and international public events to examine the number, brands, and prices of her apparel and accessories. Their quantity and high price caused some to demand the Blue House (Cheong Wa Dae; the then-presidential office) reveal the payment sources. The Korea Taxpayers Association (KTA) filed two lawsuits against the Blue House, once in 2019 and again in February 2022. The Seoul Administrative Court ruled that the presidential office must disclose the prices of clothing Kim wore at official events. The Blue House, not complying with the ruling, insisted that the payment information was pertaining to national security would remain classified for at least 15 years. It added that Kim paid for her clothing with her own money.

References 

|-

1954 births
Living people
20th-century South Korean women singers
21st-century classical violinists
First Ladies of South Korea
South Korean opera singers
South Korean classical violinists
Kyung Hee University alumni
People from Seoul
Moon Jae-in
South Korean Roman Catholics
Commanders Grand Cross of the Order of the Polar Star
Grand Cross of the Order of Civil Merit